STEF (formerly STEF-TFE)  is a European specialist in cold logistics for temperature-sensitive, and agro-food products.

STEF is active in 7 European countries: Belgium, Spain, France, Italy, the Netherlands, Portugal and Switzerland. The group employs 18,000 staff members and operates with specialised assets: 236 platforms and warehouses, 1,900 vehicles and 1,950 refrigerated trailers.

STEF's annual turnover for 2018 was €3,255 million.

Its main clients are the food industry, the retail industry and food service.

Le groupe STEF 
STEF Transport (formerly TFE) is a dedicated network for ambient, chilled and frozen products' transportation. 
STEF Logistique (formerly STEF) provides logistics services for ambient, fresh and frozen products. 
STEF Seafood (formerly Tradimar) is a dedicated network for the transportation and logistics services of fresh and frozen seafood products. 
STEF Iberia (formerly S.D.F) manages chilled and frozen products throughout the Iberia peninsula.
STEF Italia (formerly CAVALIERI TRASPORTI S.P.A., TFE DA and Dispensa Logistics) is 30 sites strong in Italy and offers both transportation and logistics services for temperature-controlled products. 
STEF Benelux caters to clients in Belgium, Luxembourg and the Netherlands for both transportation and logistics services.
STEF Information et Technologies (formerly AGROSTAR) is the group's IT subsidiary, as well as a software editor for the food supply chain sector.
SPEKSNIJDER TRANSPORT supports STEF Benelux in serving Benelux clients.

References 

Sito ufficiale italiano: www.stef.it

French companies established in 1920
Companies based in Paris
Transport companies established in 1920
Logistics companies of France
Business services companies established in 1920
Companies listed on Euronext Paris